Hypocrita temperata is a moth of the family Erebidae. It was described by Francis Walker in 1856. It is found in Brazil and French Guiana.

References

 

Hypocrita
Moths described in 1856